The 2019–20 Coupe de France preliminary rounds, Hauts-de-France was the qualifying competition to decide which teams from the leagues of the Hauts-de-France region of France took part in the main competition from the seventh round.

A total of twenty-one teams qualified from the Hauts-de-France preliminary rounds. In 2018–19, Iris Club de Croix progressed furthest in the main competition, reaching the round of 16 before losing to Dijon.

Schedule
The first two rounds of the qualifying competition took place on the weekends of 25 August and 1 September 2019. A total of 788 teams participated in the first round. 180 teams entered at the second round stage.

The third round draw took place on 5 September 2019. Ten teams from Championnat National 3 (tier 5) and 27 from Régional 1 (tier 6) joined the competition at this stage.

The fourth round draw took place on 19 September 2019. Two teams from Championnat National 2 (tier 4) joined the competition at this stage, and 82 ties were drawn.

The fifth round draw took place on 3 October 2019. Two teams from Championnat National (tier 3) joined the competition at this stage, and 42 ties were drawn.

The sixth round draw took place on 16 October 2019.

First round
These matches were played on 24 and 25 August 2019, with one match replayed on 1 September 2019.

Second round
These matches were played on 1 September 2019, with two matches waiting for delayed first round results to be played on 8 September 2019.

Third round
These matches were played on 14 and 15 September 2019, with one replayed on 6 October 2019.

Fourth round
These matches were played on 28 and 29 September 2019, with one match dependent on the previous round played on 13 October 2019.

Fifth round
These matches were played on 12 and 13 October 2019, with one match dependent on the previous round played on 20 October 2019.

Sixth round
These matches were played on 26 and 27 October and 3 November 2019.

References

Preliminary rounds